Mikhail Smirnov may refer to:
 Mikhail Alexandrovich Smirnov (astronomer) (1954–2006), Russian astronomer
 Mikhail Ivanovich Smirnov (1880-1940), Russian naval officer, first and only Minister of the Navy of the White Movement.
 Mikhail Nikolayevich Smirnov (1881-1957), Russian international footballer
Mikhail Nikolayevich Smirnov (general) (1900–1967), Soviet military commander
 Mikhail Olegovich Smirnov (born 1990), Russian footballer
 Mikhail Smirnov (footballer, born 1967), Belarusian footballer who played for FC Dnepr Mogilev, Lokomotiv Minsk and lower-level German teams, among others]
 Mikhail Smirnov (singer) (born 2003), Russian singer, record producer and stage actor, participant of Junior Eurovision Song Contest 2015

See also
 Smirnov (surname)
 Smirnoff (surname)
 Asteroid 109573 Mishasmirnov, named after the astronomer